Harley Windsor (né Dahlstrom-Windsor; born 22 October 1996) is an Australian pair skater. With his former skating partner, Ekaterina Alexandrovskaya, he is the 2017 Junior World Champion, the 2017 CS Tallinn Trophy champion, the 2017 CS Nebelhorn Trophy bronze medallist, the 2018 CS U.S. Classic bronze medallist and a two-time Australian national champion (2016, 2018).

Personal life 
Harley Dahlstrom-Windsor was born on 22 October 1996 in Penrith, New South Wales, and was raised in Rooty Hill. The youngest child of Josie and Peter Dahlstrom, he has eight half-siblings from his parents' earlier marriages. He is of Australian Aboriginal heritage; His mother, raised near Gulargambone, has Weilwyn and Gamilaraay ancestry, and his father, from Moree, New South Wales, is of Gamilaraay, Ngarrable, and Swedish descent.

Skating career

Early career 
Windsor began skating in 2005 after an ice rink in Blacktown caught his interest. Galina and Andrei Pachin began coaching him in Canterbury in late 2006. After competing in singles, he began learning pairs and passing qualifying tests with partners from New South Wales and Queensland.

Teaming up with Alexandrovskaya 
Responding to a query from the Pachins, Russia-based coach Nina Mozer suggested a tryout between Ekaterina Alexandrovskaya and Windsor in Moscow.  The two began skating together in December 2015. Observing the tryout, the coaches believed that the skaters would make a good match due to similar techniques and body types.

Alexandrovskaya was released by Russia after a request from the Australian skating association, with help from Mozer.

2016–2017 season 

During the season, Alexandrovskaya/Windsor were coached by the Pachins in Sydney and by Andrei Hekalo and Nina Mozer in Moscow. Their international debut came in early September 2016 at the Junior Grand Prix (JGP) in Ostrava, Czech Republic. Ranked 6th in the short program and 9th in the free skate, the pair finished 8th overall. Later that month, the two competed at a JGP event in Tallinn, Estonia. They were awarded the gold medal ahead of three Russian pairs after placing third in the short and first in the free. They finished as the first substitutes for the JGP Final in Marseille, France.

Alexandrovskaya/Windsor made their senior debut in October 2016 at a Challenger Series event, the Finlandia Trophy; they placed sixth and obtained the minimum technical scores to compete at senior-level ISU Championships. In December, the pair placed 5th in France at the JGP Final, to which they were called up as replacements for Russia's Ekaterina Borisova / Dmitry Sopot. Windsor tore his patella tendon in January 2017. The following month, the pair placed 11th at the 2017 Four Continents Championships in Gangneung, South Korea.

In March, Alexandrovskaya/Windsor competed at the 2017 World Junior Championships in Taipei, Taiwan. Ranked third in the short program and second in the free skate, they finished first overall, outscoring the silver medallists, Aleksandra Boikova / Dmitrii Kozlovskii of Russia, by 2.05 points. They became the first skaters representing Australia to win gold at one of the ISU Figure Skating Championships and the first to finish on a podium at Junior Worlds since 1976, when Elizabeth Cain / Peter Cain took the pairs' bronze medal.

A couple of weeks later, the pair competed at the senior-level World Championships, which took place in Helsinki, Finland. They qualified to the free skate and went on to finish 16th.

2017–2018 season 
In early September, Alexandrovskaya/Windsor finished fourth at the 2017 JGP in Riga, Latvia. Later in the month, they competed at the 2017 CS Nebelhorn Trophy, the final qualifying opportunity for the 2018 Winter Olympics. Ranked fourth in the short program and third in the free skate, they won their first senior international medal, bronze. Their result also allowed them to become the first Australian pair skaters to compete at the Olympics since Danielle Carr / Stephen Carr's appearance at the 1998 Winter Olympics in Nagano.

In October, Alexandrovskaya/Windsor placed first in both segments at the JGP event in Gdańsk, Poland; they were awarded the gold medal and qualified to the JGP Final in Nagoya, Japan. In December, they won gold at the final, becoming the first Australian champions in the event's history.

In January, Alexandrovskaya/Windsor finished 6th overall at the 2018 Four Continents Championships in Taipei, Taiwan. They were awarded a small silver medal for their performance in the short program. In February, the two represented Australia at the 2018 Winter Olympics in Pyeongchang, South Korea. Windsor became the first Indigenous Australian to compete at the Winter Olympics. Ranked 18th in the short program, Alexandrovskaya/Windsor were not among the 16 pairs who advanced to the free skate. They were more successful at the 2018 World Championships in Milan, Italy, placing 15th in the short program and 16th overall.

At the National Dreamtime Awards 2018 Windsor was named Best New Sports Talent.

2018–2019 season 
Alexandrovskaya/Windsor moved to Montreal to train with coaches Richard Gauthier and Bruno Marcotte.  Despite beginning the season with a bronze medal at the 2018 CS U.S. Classic, the move was unsuccessful, and both struggled with health and fitness concerns.  They finished sixth at the 2018 CS Nebelhorn Trophy, and then made their senior Grand Prix debut, finishing seventh of eight teams at both 2018 Skate Canada International and 2018 Rostelecom Cup.  

Windsor developed a chronic foot inflammation that compelled them to miss both the Four Continents and World Championships.

2019–2020 season 
After their unsuccessful season, Alexandrovskaya/Windsor moved back to Sydney and were joined there by former coach Andrei Khekalo.  After months of experimentation, a solution was found for Windsor's foot inflammation that allowed them to resume training on ice.  Alexandrovskaya/Windsor placed ninth at the 2019 CS Nebelhorn Trophy, and then finished seventh at the 2019 Skate America, their lone Grand Prix assignment.

On February 26, 2020, Windsor announced that he and Alexandrovskaya had dissolved their partnership due to Alexandrovskaya's ongoing health issues. Five months later, Aleksandrovskaya died by suicide.

2020–2021 & 2021–2022 seasons 
Windsor did not compete during the 2020-2021 season. In August 2021, he was listed in the start list for a Russian club competition with a new partner, Maria Chernyshova. Chernyshova/Windsor made their international debut for Australia at the 2021 CS Golden Spin of Zagreb in December 2021.

Programs 

With Alexandrovskaya

Competitive highlights 

CS: Challenger Series; JGP: Junior Grand Prix

Pairs with Chernyshova

Pairs with Alexandrovskaya

Men's singles

References

External links 
 

1996 births
Australian male pair skaters
Indigenous Australian Olympians
Living people
Figure skaters from Sydney
Figure skaters at the 2018 Winter Olympics
Olympic figure skaters of Australia
World Junior Figure Skating Championships medalists